Ashton Holmes (born February 17, 1978) is an American actor, best known for the role of Jack Stall in A History of Violence (2005), Private Sidney Phillips in the HBO miniseries The Pacific (2010), Thom on the CW action-thriller series Nikita (2010–2011), and as Tyler Barrol on the ABC drama series Revenge (2011–2012).

Personal life
Holmes was born in Albany, New York. His mother, Susan, is a social worker. At a young age he began taking acting lessons and appeared in community theater. He attended The Albany Academy. During his senior year of high school, he attended the intern program of the New York State Theater Institute.

Holmes was involved with the Albany music scene, and was the lead singer for local band Method of Groove. During this time, Holmes befriended Nyack, New York band Coheed and Cambria, and began shopping around their demos to local indie labels. According to the Coheed and Cambria documentary Neverender: Children of The Fence Edition, in which Holmes appears, it was Holmes who eventually earned them their first record deal with Equal Vision Records.

Career
Holmes made his debut on television with a recurring role in the daytime soap opera One Life to Live. In 2005 he starred in David Cronenberg's film A History of Violence. The next year, he had a recurring role on ABC's series Boston Legal. He also appeared in Peaceful Warrior in 2006, What We Do Is Secret and Normal Adolescent Behavior in 2007. In 2007 Holmes co-starred with Emily Blunt in the horror film Wind Chill. In 2008 he appeared in the comedy-drama film Smart People.

On television he appeared in episodes of Law & Order: Special Victims Unit, Cold Case, Ghost Whisperer, Numbers, House, Law & Order: Criminal Intent as well as 'Boston Legal and CSI: Crime Scene Investigation.

In 2010 Holmes played Sid Phillips in the HBO miniseries The Pacific. From 2010 to 2011, he starred as Thom in The CW series Nikita. From 2011 to 2012, he appeared as Tyler Barrol on the ABC drama series Revenge. On February 21, 2013, it was reported that Holmes was cast as Wyatt Bickford in the ABC drama pilot Reckless.

From 2002 to 2005, Holmes was also part of the Collins Tour company for Jonathan Larson's musical, Rent'', in which he played one of the lead characters, Mark Cohen.

Filmography

References

External links
 
 

1978 births
21st-century American male actors
Male actors from New York (state)
American male film actors
American male television actors
American male soap opera actors
Living people
Actors from Albany, New York
The Albany Academy alumni